This is a list of newspapers in Connecticut.

Daily newspapers (currently published)This is a list of daily newspapers currently published in Connecticut. For weekly and university newspapers, see List of newspapers in Connecticut.
 CTNewsJunkie – Hartford
 The Advocate – Stamford
 The Bristol Press – Bristol
 The Bulletin – Norwich
 the Chronicle – Willimantic
The Connecticut Examiner - Old Lyme
 Connecticut Post – Bridgeport
 The Day – New London
 Fairfield County CT Inquirer – Norwalk
 Greenwich Time – Greenwich
 Hartford Courant – Hartford
 New Britain Herald – New Britain
 The Hour – Norwalk
 Journal Inquirer – Manchester
 The Middletown Press – Middletown
 New Haven Register – New Haven
 The News-Times – Danbury
 Record-Journal – Meriden
 The Register Citizen – Torrington
 Republican-American – WaterburyWeekly newspapers (currently published)
 Afroasia Newspaper – Stamford
 Amity Observer – Amity
 The Bethel Community Gazette - Bethel
 The Bloomfield Messenger – Bloomfield
 The Branford Review – Guilford
 The Brookfield Community Gazette - Brookfield
 The Brookfield Journal – New Milford
 The Cheshire Herald – Cheshire
 The Chronicle Weekly – Willimantic
 The Commercial Record – South Windsor
 The Connecticut Mirror  – Hartford
 The Darien Times – Darien
 Darien News-Review – Darien
 East Hartford Gazette – East Hartford
 East Haddam News – East Haddam
 The Easton Community Gazette - Easton
 Fairfield Citizen-News – Fairfield
 Fairfield Minuteman – Fairfield
 Glastonbury Citizen – Glastonbury
 Haddam-Killingworth News - Haddam, Killingworth (Website)
 Herald Press, 1996 – present
 Huntington Herald – Shelton
 Inquirer Group – Hartford
 Jewish Ledger – West Hartford
 Kent Good Times Dispatch – Kent
 Killingly Villager – Killingly
 Litchfield Enquirer – Litchfield
 The Monroe Community Gazette - Monroe
 Monroe Courier – Monroe
 Mystic River Press – Mystic
 The New Canaan News – New Canaan
 New Haven Advocate – New Haven
 New Milford Times – New Milford
 Newington Town Crier – Bristol
 The Newtown Bee – Newtown
 The Newtown Community Gazette - Newtown
 North Haven Citizen – North Haven
 Northend Agents – Hartford
 Pictorial-Gazette – Guilford
 Putnam Villager – Putnam, Connecticut
 The Redding Community Gazette - Redding
 The Redding Pilot – Redding
 Reminder News – Vernon
 The Ridgefield Community Gazette - Ridgefield
 The Ridgefield Press – Ridgefield
 Shoreline Times – Guilford
 Sol, El – Stamford
 The Sound – Madison
 Thomaston Express – Thomaston
 Thompson Villager – Thompson, Connecticut
 Town Times – Durham and Middlefield
 Town Times – Watertown
 Town Tribune – New Fairfield
 Tribuna (a.k.a. La Tribuna, "The Tribune") – Danbury
 Trumbull Times – Shelton
 Valley News – Bristol
 Voices and Voices Weekender – Southbury
 West Hartford News – Bristol
 The Weston Forum – Weston
 The Windsor Locks Journal Weekly – Windsor Locks
 The Windsor Journal Weekly – Windsor
 Westport Minuteman – Westport
 Westport News – Westport
 The Wilton Bulletin – Wilton
 Windsor Journal – Bristol
 Windsor Locks Journal – Bristol
 Woodstock Villager – Woodstock, Connecticut

University newspapers
 The Campus Lantern – Eastern Connecticut State University (Willimantic)
 Charger Bulletin – University of New Haven (West Haven)
 The Daily Campus – UConn. (Storrs)
 The Echo – Western Connecticut State University (Danbury)
 Fairfield Mirror – Fairfield University (Fairfield)
 The Hartford Informer – University of Hartford (West Hartford)
 Wesleyan Argus – Wesleyan University (Middletown)
 Yale Daily News – Yale (New Haven)
 The Southern News – Southern Connecticut State University (New Haven)
 The Spectrum – Sacred Heart University (Fairfield)

Defunct
American Sentinel, including 1823-1826, weekly
Connecticut Spectator, including May 1814 - December 1814, weekly
The Constitution, former weekly newspaper, including during 1842-1884
The Daily Herald, former daily newspaper
Evening Press, including 1918 - 1919, daily ex. Sun.
 The Hartford Times
Middlesex Gazette, including 1790 - 1834 (with gaps), weekly
Middletown Daily Constitution, including 1872 - 1876, daily ex. Sun.
Middletown Daily Sentinel, including January 1876 - June 1876, daily ex. Sun.
Middletown Sun, including 1908 - 1914, daily ex. Sun.
Regional Standard – Guilford
The Middletown Times, daily newspaper in Middletown during 1913-1914 or during 1914-January 1915
The Middletown Tribune, Republican newspaper in Middletown, Connecticut including 1893-1906, daily ex. Sun
News and Advertiser, including 1851-1854, weekly
Penny Press, including 1884 - 1939, daily ex. Sun.
The Sentinel and Witness, former weekly newspaper, including 1869-1884

Danbury
Newspapers published in Danbury, Connecticut:  

 Farmers Chronicle. W., June 17, 1793-Sept. 19, 1796.
 Farmer's Journal. W., March 18, 1790 – June 3, 1793.

Fairfield
Newspapers published in Fairfield, Connecticut:

 Fairfield Gazette. W., July 13, 1786-Feb. (?), 1787.
 Fairfield Gazette, Or The Independent Intelligencer. W., Feb. 15 (?), 1787-Aug. (?), 1787.

Hartford
Newspapers published in Hartford, Connecticut:

 American Mercury. W., July 12, 1784-June 25, 1833.
 The Connecticut Courant. W., Oct. 29, 1764-May 31, 1774; Feb. 17, May 5, 12, 1778; Mar. 21, 1791-Dec. 29, 1800+E. Wilder Spaulding. The Connecticut Courant, a Representative Newspaper in the Eighteenth Century. The New England Quarterly, Vol. 3, No. 3 (Jul., 1930), pp. 443-463
 The Connecticut Courant, And Hartford Weekly Intelligencer. W., June 7, 1774-Feb. 10, 1778.
 The Connecticut Courant And The Weekly Intelligencer. W., Feb. 24, 1778-Mar. 14, 1791.
 The Freeman's Chronicle, Or The American Advertiser. W., Sept. 1, 1783-July 8, 1784.
 Hartford Gazette. S.W., W., Jan. 13, 1794-Mar. 19, 1795.

Litchfield
Newspapers published in Litchfield, Connecticut:

 Collier's Litchfield Weekly Monitor. W., Jan. 7-June 16, 1788.
 The Farmer's Monitor. W., Mar. 5-Dec. 31, 1800+
 Litchfield-County Monitor. W., Dec. 11, 1790-Jan. 3, 1791.
 Litchfield Monitor. W., Jan. 10, 1791-Jan. 4, 1792; Aug. 27, 1794-June 3, 1795.
 Litchfield Monitor And Agricultural Register. W., June 10, 1795 – May 11, 1796.
 The Litchfield Weekly Monitor. June 23, 1788.
 The Monitor. W., Jan. 11, 1792-Aug. 20, 1794; Feb. 28, 1798-Feb. 26, 1800+
 Weekly Monitor. W., Mar. Or April 1785-Nov. 28, 1786; June 11-Dec. 31, 1787; June 30, 1788-May 11, 1789; Nov. 17, 1789-Dec. 4, 1790; May 18, 1796-Feb. 21, 1798.
 Weekly Monitor And American Advertiser. W., Dec. 21, 1784-Mar. 1785.
 Weekly Monitor And Litchfield Town And County Recorder. W., Dec. 5, 1786-June 4, 1787.
 Weekly Monitor And The Litchfield Advertiser. W., May 18- June 8, 1789.

Middletown
Newspapers published in Middletown, Connecticut:

 The Middlesex Gazette. W., Nov. 8, 1785-Oct. 29, 1787; Mar. 3, 1792-Dec. 26, 1800+
 The Middlesex Gazette, Or Federal Adviser. W., Nov. 5, 1787-Feb. 25, 1792.

New Haven
Newspapers published in New Haven, Connecticut:

 The Connecticut Gazette. W., July 5, 1765-Feb. 19, 1768.
 Connecticut Gazette, With The Freshest Advices Foreign And Domestick. W., Apr. 12, 1755-Apr. 14, 1764.
 The Connecticut Journal. W., Sept. 13, 1775-Jan. 3, 1799; Apr. 4, 1799-Dec. 31, 1800+
 The Connecticut Journal, And New-Haven Post-Boy. W., Oct. 23, 1767-Sept. 6, 1775.
 Connecticut Journal And Weekly Advertiser. W., Jan. 10- Mar. 28, 1799.
 The New-Haven Chronicle. W., Apr. 18, 1786-Sept. 11, 1787.
  New-Haven Gazette. W., May 13, 1784-Feb. 9, 1786.
 The New-Haven Gazette. W., Jan. 5-June 29, 1791.
 The New-Haven Gazette, And The Connecticut Magazine. W., Feb. 16, 1786-June 18, 1789.

New London
Newspapers published in New London, Connecticut:

 The Bee. W., June 14, 1797-Dec. 31, 1800+
  The Connecticut Gazette. W., May 11, 1787-Dec. 25, 1799.
 Connecticut Gazette, And The Commercial Intelligencer. W., Jan. 1-Dec. 31, 1800+
 Connecticut Gazette, And The Universal Intelligencer. W., Dec. 17, 1773-May 4, 1787.
 The New-London Advertiser. W., Mar. 2-Apr. 13, 1795.
 The New-London Gazette. W., Nov. 18, 1763-Dec. 10, 1773.

 The New-London Summary. W., Sometime Between May 6 And 17, 1763-Sept 23, 1763.
 The New-London Summary, Or The Weekly Advertiser. W., Aug. 8, 1758-Sometime Between May 6 And June 10, 1763.
 Springer's Weekly Oracle. W., Oct. 21, 1797-Dec. 28, 1800+

Newfield
Newspapers published in Newfield, Connecticut:

 American Telegraphe. W., Apr. 8, 1795-July 6, 1796; Apr. 5, 1797-Oct. 29, 1800.
 American Telegraphe, & Fairfield County Gazette. W., July 13, 17-Mar. 2, 1797.

Norwich
Newspapers published in Norwich, Connecticut:

 Chelsea Courier. W., Nov. 30, 1796-May 24, 1798.
 The Courier. W., May 31, 1798-Mar. 15, 1800.
The Oxford English Dictionary attests the first recorded use of the term "Hello" to The Courier in 1826.

 The Norwich Packet. W., Dec. 29, 1777-June 1, 1779; June 9, 1791-Dec. 30, 1800+
 The Norwich Packet; And The Connecticut, Massachusetts, New-Hampshire, And Rhode-Island Weekly Advertiser. W., Oct. 7, 1773-Dec. 22, 1777.
 The Norwich Packet And The Country Journal. W., Feb. 8, 1787-Sept. 24, 1790.
 The Norwich Packet And The Weekly Advertiser. W., June 8, 1779-Sept. 26, 1782.
 The Norwich Packet, Or The Chronicle Of Freedom. W., Oct. 30, 1783-Apr. 7, 1785.
 The Norwich-Packet, Or The Country Journal. W., Apr. 14, 1785-Feb. 1, 1787.
 Vox Populi Norwich Packet. W., Oct. 1, 1790-June 2, 1791.
 The Weekly Register. W., Nov. 29, 1791-Aug. 19, 1795.

Sharon
Newspapers published in Sharon, Connecticut:

 Rural Gazette. W. Mar. 31, 1800.

Stonington
Newspapers published in Stonington, Connecticut:

 Impartial Journal. W., Oct. 8 (?) 1799-Dec. 30, 1800+
 Journal of the Times. W., Oct. 10, 1798-Sept. 17, 1799.

Windham
Newspapers published in Windham, Connecticut:

 The Phenix, Or Windham Herald. W., Mar. 12, 1791-Apr. 12, 1798.
 Windham Herald. W., Apr. 19, 1798-Dec. 26, 1800+

See also
 List of newspapers in Connecticut in the 18th century
 List of radio stations in Connecticut
 List of television stations in Connecticut
Adjoining states
 List of newspapers in Massachusetts
 List of newspapers in New York
 List of newspapers in Rhode Island

References

Further reading
 

External links

 http://www.cslib.org/newspaper/newshistory.htm